Çukurköy is a village in the Pervari District of Siirt Province in Turkey. The village had a population of 245 in 2021.

The hamlet of Üçoyuk is attached to the village.

References 

Villages in Pervari District
Kurdish settlements in Siirt Province